is a Japanese swimmer, who specialized in individual medley events. She is a 2004 Olympian, and a multiple-time Japanese record holder in both the 200 and 400 m individual medley.

Amano qualified for the medley swimming events, as a 17-year-old, at the 2004 Summer Olympics in Athens, by attaining an A-standard entry time of 4:43.72 from the Japanese Olympic trials. On the first day of the competition, Amano finished tenth in the preliminary heats of the women's 400 m individual medley with a time of 4:45.61, failing to qualify for the final by 0.45 of a second outside the top 8. In the 200 m individual medley, Amano continued her luck in the preliminary heats, as she missed again a spot for the semifinals by more than six tenths of a second (0.60) behind New Zealand's Helen Norfolk, in a time of 2:17.88.

References

External links
Profile – Japanese Olympic Committee 

1986 births
Living people
Olympic swimmers of Japan
Swimmers at the 2004 Summer Olympics
Japanese female medley swimmers
Sportspeople from Kanagawa Prefecture
21st-century Japanese women